Bruno Bracalente is an Italian politician and professor who served as President of Umbria and university professor and Director of the Department of Statistical Sciences at University of Perugia. In 1995 Italian regional elections, he got 331,349 or 59.94% votes.

References 

Presidents of Umbria
Politicians of Umbria
Year of birth missing (living people)
Living people